Daniel Lopes Amora (born 20 October 1987) is a Brazilian footballer plays as a midfielder.

Career statistics

References

1987 births
Living people
Brazilian footballers
Brazilian expatriate footballers
Campeonato Brasileiro Série B players
Campeonato Brasileiro Série C players
Saudi Professional League players
UAE Pro League players
Saudi First Division League players
Águia de Marabá Futebol Clube players
Grêmio Barueri Futebol players
Paysandu Sport Club players
Guaratinguetá Futebol players
América Futebol Clube (RN) players
ABC Futebol Clube players
São Bernardo Futebol Clube players
Sampaio Corrêa Futebol Clube players
Al-Raed FC players
Hatta Club players
Al-Tai FC players
Expatriate footballers in Saudi Arabia
Expatriate footballers in the United Arab Emirates
Brazilian expatriate sportspeople in Saudi Arabia
Brazilian expatriate sportspeople in the United Arab Emirates
Association football midfielders
Footballers from Belo Horizonte